Operation Marauder was an operation conducted by the 173rd Airborne Brigade and the 1st Battalion, Royal Australian Regiment (1 RAR) in the Plain of Reeds, Mekong Delta, lasting from 1 to 8 January 1966.

Prelude
The Plain of Reeds had long been used as a base by the Viet Cong (VC). Operation Marauder marked the first time that U.S. forces had operated in the area.

Operation

On 1 January 1966 1st Battalion, 503rd Infantry Regiment, 2nd Battalion, 503rd Infantry Regiment, 1 RAR and C Battery, 3rd Battalion, 319th Artillery Regiment which included 161 Battery, Royal New Zealand Artillery, were deployed by air into Ba Tri airfield from Hậu Nghĩa Province.

On 2 January 2/503rd landed at Landing Zone Wine where they were engaged by an entrenched Viet Cong force. After a daylong battle, supported by artillery fire and air support the 2/503rd overran the VC position, finding 111 dead. The remainder of the operation saw only sporadic contact with the VC. 

On 3 January 1966, two rounds fired by 161 Bty accidentally landed on C Company, 2/503rd killing three paratroopers and wounding seven. The short rounds were found to have happened due to damp powder.

The Australians from 1 RAR also were engaged in extensive patrolling activity during the January 2–6 period. They made small, sporadic contact with the enemy in their sector, killing two VC. However, they also found an ammunition cache and several large rice caches. On January 5, one patrol made contact with a VC platoon in the vicinity of Hoa Khanh, but the enemy broke contact and fled.

On 6 January the 2/503rd located the abandoned headquarters of the 506th Battalion, recovering arms, ammunition, maps and personnel rosters.

Aftermath
Operation Marauder officially concluded on 8 January with claims of heavy losses having been inflicted on the VC 267th Main Force Battalion and the headquarters of the 506th Battalion.

References

Conflicts in 1966
1966 in Vietnam
Battles involving the United States
Battles of the Vietnam War involving Australia
Battles involving Vietnam
Battles and operations of the Vietnam War in 1966
History of Đồng Tháp Province
History of Long An Province